Get Up Stand Up is a studio album by Shabba Ranks, released in 1998. It was Ranks's final studio album, and contains many remixes of songs previously recorded by him.

Critical reception
AllMusic called Get Up Stand Up "a strange but highly effective Frankenstein's monster of an album," writing that "the combination of Shabba Ranks and King Jammy is simply a can't-miss proposition."

Track listing 
 Get Up Stand Up (remix)
 Mus Haffi Learn
 Mus Love Reggae
 Can't Keep Me Down (remix)
 Halla Fi Buddy (remix)
 Mus Get A Man
 Live Blanket (remix)
 Wine Mi Tonight
 Best Grandfather
 Be Careful
 Love Punanny Bad
 Who She Love
 Original Fresh
 Rule Mi Route

References

1998 albums
Shabba Ranks albums